Ensina longiceps is a species of tephritid or fruit flies in the genus Ensina of the family Tephritidae.

Distribution
Peru, Bolivia, Argentina.

References

Tephritinae
Insects described in 1914
Diptera of South America